Trichopeltospora is a genus of fungi in the Microthyriaceae family; according to the 2007 Outline of Ascomycota, the placement in this family is uncertain.

Species
As accepted by Species Fungorum;
 Trichopeltospora pipericola 
 Trichopeltospora reticulata 

Former species;
 T. pipericola var. elongata  = Trichopeltospora pipericola
 T. pipericola var. minospora = Trichopeltospora pipericola

References

External links
Index Fungorum

Microthyriales